Enrique Castaño Cervera (born 23 January 1993) is a Spanish footballer who plays for Real Avilés CF as a midfielder.

Club career
Castaño was born in Las Palmas, Canary Islands. After starting out with AD Huracán's, he completed his formation with Real Madrid, joining its youth system in 2007 at the age of 14. He made his senior debut on 13 May 2012, playing with the C-team against CF Trival Valderas.

In the 2012 summer Castaño joined AD Alcorcón, initially being assigned to the reserves. On 2 February 2013 he appeared in his first game as a professional, playing 20 minutes against in a 0–3 away loss against Hércules CF.

On 2 September 2013 Castaño joined another reserve team, UD Las Palmas Atlético, in Segunda División B.

On 30 June 2019, Castaño signed a one-year contract with fourth division team Real Avilés CF.

References

External links

1993 births
Living people
Footballers from Las Palmas
Spanish footballers
Association football midfielders
Segunda División players
Segunda División B players
Tercera División players
Real Madrid C footballers
AD Alcorcón B players
AD Alcorcón footballers
UD Las Palmas Atlético players
Mérida AD players
Spain youth international footballers